Ormetica codasi is a moth of the family Erebidae. It was described by Peter Jörgensen in 1935. It is found in Paraguay.

References

Ormetica
Moths described in 1935
Arctiinae of South America